Stereosandra is a genus of leafless orchids native to Southeast Asia (Thailand,  Vietnam, Malaysia, Philippines, Indonesia), the range extending north to Yunnan, Taiwan and the Ryukyu Islands, and also eastward to New Guinea, the Solomon Islands and Samoa. These are myco-heterotrophic orchids, lacking chlorophyll, obtaining nutrients from fungi in the soil instead.

As of June 2014, only one species is recognized: Stereosandra javanica.

References

External links 

Virbota Virtual Botanical Garden, Stereosandra javanica Blume 
photos by Wang, 友人提供照片,  Stereosandra javanica

Monotypic Epidendroideae genera
Epipogiinae
Orchids of Asia
Orchids of New Guinea
Flora of the Solomon Islands (archipelago)
Flora of Samoa
Myco-heterotrophic orchids
Nervilieae genera